The Shape of Water (Original Motion Picture Soundtrack) is the soundtrack album to the Academy Award-winning film of the same name. It featured 26 tracks — most of the tracks were from the original score composed by Alexandre Desplat and some tracks are incorporated songs, being originated from the 1940s and 1960s as the film is set during the Cold War period. The film, directed by Guillermo del Toro, who also co-wrote the script with Vanessa Taylor, stars Sally Hawkins, Michael Shannon, Richard Jenkins, Doug Jones, Michael Stuhlbarg, and Octavia Spencer.

Desplat initially intended to collaborate with del Toro for the stop-motion animated film Pinocchio, based on The Adventures of Pinocchio (1883) by Carlo Collodi in late-2012, which went on development hell months after. The following year (or by early-2014), del Toro narrated the film's premise to Desplat and was shown a preview of the finished film, which left Desplat impressed and finding similar to a musical, he agreed to score for the film. Desplat took six weeks to write the film's music, which was a "tender, warm and fragile" score like love. Desplat extensively captured the sound of water for the film, and used piano and flutes, to create the "blurred underwater sound". Desplat, who thought the film as a "masterpiece", complimenting del Toro's filmmaking, said that "when the movie's that beautiful, it makes your life much easier. You just have to put your hands on it and it takes you anywhere you want."

The album was released on December 1, 2017 by Decca Records in digital and physical formats, and was released on October 5, 2018 in vinyl. The score received critical acclaim praising Desplat's minimalistic approach and melodious underscore. Desplat won the Academy Award for Best Original Score for his work in the film; his second win after The Grand Budapest Hotel. He further won the BAFTA Award, Critics Choice Award and Golden Globe Award for "Best Original Score", in addition to receiving numerous awards and nominations, including nominations for three Grammy Awards and a Satellite Award for Best Original Score.

Development 
The Shape of Water marked the first collaboration between Desplat and del Toro. Both the director and composer, initially wanted to collaborate on the "darker adaptation" of the 1883 Italian novel The Adventures of Pinocchio by Carlo Collodi, being planned as a stop-motion animated film, with American musician Nick Cave confirming Desplat's inclusion in the project. But the film, went into development hell in late-2012. By late-2013 or early-2014, del Toro met Desplat to talk about the film's premise. In January 2017, Desplat was shown a rough cut of the finished film, and finding it similar to a musical, he agreed to compose a score. Desplat felt "shocked by the beauty of the film" and appreciated del Toro's direction, which he felt that "the most difficult thing, interweaving reality and imagination and bringing the audience into that world with no effort. It effortlessly takes you into his world, and that’s very rare."

Desplat tried to capture the sound of water extensively to have audiences experience a "warm feeling" that is also caused by love. He also opined that "love has no color and no texture" and just "goes everywhere" comparing love to water. In an interview, he said the melody from the opening scene was "actually made of waves. I did not do that on purpose, but by being completely immersed in this love and these water elements, I wrote a melody that plays arpeggios like waves." The score was not composed chronologically, but "finding the opening was the key to find the entry to the film. What is the soul of the film? It’s all there at the beginning. And actually it’s the same thing we hear at the end. Because we’re underwater, it’s a dream, everything’s floating in the room." Desplat said that "the music is already giving us audience a touch of what the story is, which is warm, a bit fragile, a bit melancholy but not too much". He took six weeks to write the film score.

The score was purposely composed to create the sense of immersion and to give the "sense that you, yourself, are floating". The two melodies, one titled "Elisa's Theme", are heard at the beginning of the film and later merge into a single piece of music by the end of it. To emphasize this effect and its final result, Desplat changed the sounds of the accompanying flutes, accordions, and whistles to "something blurred". For the accordions, he chose the bandoneon, played most frequently in South American music, rather than playing the accordians in a more french manner, as the "amphibian man" (or sea creature), originated from south america and is musically represented with "flourishes and scales like a tango master would do". Several instruments ranging from Fender piano, electric piano, and over 12 flutes, were played for the opening scene to create that "blurred underwater sound". He did not approach for a big orchestral score for a "tender" film and created the sounds with bass flutes, alto flutes, along with strings and accordions.

On composing the score overall, he said that it was "a matter of sculpting the music and making it take the shape of the storyline." As a result, Desplat opted out of giving Shannon's character a melody. He also avoided giving an underscore for the "amphibian man" as a monster from any horror film, as he felt that "he was not a monster" and have to "keep the organic nature of these characters."

Reception 
The score for The Shape of Water was met with critical acclaim, with Rogerebert.com's calling it as "wistful and bittersweet". Ben Sachs of Chicago Reader called Desplat's score as "fanciful" and "maintains an ambience of wonderment". Calling it as a "sumptous" and "creative fantasy of music", James Southall of Movie Wave wrote "The Shape of Water is so impressive but actually not even the most impressive score the composer wrote during 2017 is further testament to his quality." Filmtracks.com wrote "Desplat's music will delight his ardent enthusiasts with its intelligence, but others will remain unconvinced by his questionable choices when confronted by what they may perceive as oddly disconnected precision. The score will either melt your heart or make you scratch your head." Marcy Donelson of AllMusic praised the instrumentation and his efforts in creating the "sound of water", while also adding that "Whether intentional or by unconscious influence, one may hear references to film composers from the era of the story's setting as well, including [Henry] Mancini and [Bernard] Herrmann."

Track listing

For Your Consideration track list 
As with all award seasons, a For Your Consideration album was released by Fox Searchlight Pictures in late-2017. This album consists of 33 tracks which are varied from the general release album, including the exclusion of songs, alternate cues of the original underscores and cues that are not featured in the original album.
 The Shape Of Water
 Elisa's Bath
 Going To Work
 Clock & Cleaning Pt. 1
 The Creature
 Blood Stains
 Fingers
 Corridor
 Egg
 Going Home
 Spy Meeting
 Clock & Cleaning Pt. 2
 Torture
 Bob Spots Elisa
 Count These Stars
 Now It's A He
 The Escape
 General Calls
 Going To Strickland's Office
 What Is She Saying?
 Watching Ruth
 A Lead
 Cake Knife
 No Bonanza For You
 Overflow Of Love
 The Rainy Day
 Decency
 Thet Isn't Good
 They Clean
 He's Coming For You
 Without You
 You're A God
 Underwater Kiss

Accolades

Release history

Personnel 
Credits adapted from AllMusic
 Production
 Alexandre Desplat – composer, arranger
 Holly Adams – producer
 Dominique Lemonnier – producer
 Xavier Forcioli – executive producer, coordinator
 Rebecca Morellato – music production supervisor
 Joann Orgel – music coordinator

 Management
 Gavin Bayliss – marketing
 Christine Bergren – music clearance
 Ellen Ginsburg – music clearance
 Tom Cavanaugh – music business affairs
 Danielle Diego – executive in charge of music
 David Hage – music preparation
 John Houlihan – music consultant
 Karyn Hughes – A&R
 Fiona Pope – A&R
 Trent Van Der Werf – design
 Lana Hunter – product manager

 Instrumentation
 Frederic Gaillardet – piano
 Dave Arch – piano
 Jeff Boudreaux – drums
 Alexandre Desplat – flute, bass flute
 Paul Clarvis – percussion
 Riccardo del Fra – double bass
 Myriam Lafargue – accordion

 Orchestration
 London Symphony Orchestra – orchestra
 Glenn Miller & His Orchestra – orchestra
 Alexandre Desplat – orchestrator, conductor, liner notes
 Dominique Lemonnier – conductor
 Glenn Miller – conductor
 Jean-Pascal Beintus – orchestrator
 Nicolas Charron – orchestrator
 Sylvain Morizet – orchestrator
 Carmine Lauri – orchestra leader
 Jake Parker – music preparation
 Areli Quirarte – music preparation
 Claude Romano – music preparation
 Norbert Vergonjanne – music preparation

 Technical
 Romain Allender – music programming
 Jonathan Allen – sound engineer, mixing
 Peter Cobbin – sound engineer, mixing
 Ludovick Tartavel – technical assistance
 Kirsty Whalley – mixing

Notes

References 

2017 soundtrack albums
Alexandre Desplat soundtracks
Decca Records soundtracks
2010s film soundtrack albums
Scores that won the Best Original Score Academy Award